The brown-cheeked bulbul (Alophoixus bres) is a species of songbird in the bulbul family, Pycnonotidae.  It is found on Java and Bali. Its natural habitats are subtropical or tropical moist lowland forests and subtropical or tropical moist montane forests.

Taxonomy and systematics
The brown-cheeked bulbul was originally described in the genus Lanius and later classified in Criniger until moved to the genus Alophoixus in 2009. Alternate names for the brown-cheeked bulbul include the grey-cheeked bulbul, olive white-headed bulbul and scrub bulbul.

References

brown-cheeked bulbul
Birds of Malesia
brown-cheeked bulbul
Taxonomy articles created by Polbot